Chapalmalania is an extinct genus of procyonid from the Pliocene (Chapadmalalan to Uquian) of Argentina and Colombia (Ware Formation, Cocinetas Basin, La Guajira).

Description 
Due to its size, its remains were initially identified as those of a bear. It evolved from the "dog-coati" Cyonasua, which probably island-hopped from Central America during the late Miocene (7.5 million years ago), as perhaps the earliest southward mammalian migrants of the Great American Interchange. When the Isthmus of Panama rose from the sea to allow further invasions by other North American species, Chapalmalania was unable to compete and its lineage became extinct.

Chapalmalania is thought to have had an omnivorous diet similar to modern bears based on dental morphology. Bite marks attributable to Chapalmalania have been found on a glyptodont carcass and have been interpreted as scavenging behavior, suggesting that Chapalmalania also fed on carrion of large mammals on at least some occasions.

References

Further reading
Barry Cox, Colin Harrison, R.J.G. Savage, and Brian Gardiner. (1999): The Simon & Schuster Encyclopedia of Dinosaurs and Prehistoric Creatures: A Visual Who's Who of Prehistoric Life. Simon & Schuster. 
David Norman. (2001): The Big Book Of Dinosaurs. page 13, Walcome books.

External links

Prehistoric procyonids
Prehistoric carnivoran genera
Pliocene carnivorans
Piacenzian extinctions
Pliocene mammals of South America
 
Uquian
Neogene Argentina
Fossils of Argentina
Neogene Colombia
Fossils of Colombia
Fossil taxa described in 1908
Taxa named by Florentino Ameghino